Styrman Karlssons flammor (First Mate Karlsson's Sweethearts) is a Swedish film comedy from 1938 directed by Gustaf Edgren. The script was written by Oscar Rydqvist and Oscar Hemberg. It was based on Sigge Strömberg's novels Styrman Karlssons flammor and Styrman Karlssons bröllopsresa, which were published in 1918 and 1919. Edgren had earlier created a silent film version, also titled Styrman Karlssons flammor, in 1925. Three actors appeared in both films: Karin Swanström, Knut Lambert, and Nils Whiten. In Denmark, Annelise Reenberg created a Danish version of the same novels in 1958 called Styrmand Karlsen.

The Norwegian actress Nanna Stenersen played the role of Bessie Mathiesen, and another Norwegian actor, Alfred Maurstad, played a minor role as the smuggler Joe.

The film had its Swedish premiere at the Scandia theater in Stockholm on September 19, 1938.

Plot
Kalle (Anders Henrikson) and his girlfriend Blenda (Marianne Löfgren) are on the way home from Tivoli amusement park in Stockholm when he tells her that he will be away for two years as a first mate on a sailing ship, but he swears his eternal fidelity to her. During the journey, the ship take Bessie (Nanna Stenersen) on board because her vessel was wrecked. Will Kalle manage to resist the temptation of having a beautiful woman on board while Blenda is waiting for him at home?

Cast
Anders Henrikson as Kalle Karlsson, first mate on the Maria Albertina 
Karin Swanström as Mrs. Ragna Doring, widow at Stonebridge Castle 
Hjördis Petterson as Mrs. Margaret Mathiesen, née Lady Plumfield 
Nanna Stenersen as Bessie Mathiesen, her daughter, Mrs. Doring's niece
Hilding Gavle as Cecil Alexander Burke, Lord of Baconshire, Middleton, and Yukonwich 
George Fant as William ("Bill"), Mrs. Doring's husband's nephew 
Ludde Gentzel as Ludvig "Ludde" Landegren, cockswain
Erik "Bullen" Berglund as Sjögren, captain of the Maria Albertina 
David Erikson as the lawyer
Margit Manstad as the woman in the hotel room
Marianne Aminoff as Juanita 
Karin Albihn as Pamela Janitros, a Greek barmaid
Karin Bergman-de Frey as a geisha 
Ulla Sorbon as the South Sea girl
Judith Holmgren as the girl with the turban at the palisade 
Siri Olson as the girl on the street in London and guest at the inn

References

External links 
 
 ''Styrman Karlssons flammor' at the Swedish Film Database

Swedish comedy films
1938 films
1930s Swedish-language films
1938 comedy films